The Boston Brahmins or Boston elite are members of Boston's traditional upper class. They are often associated with Harvard University, Anglicanism, and traditional Anglo-American customs and clothing. Descendants of the earliest English colonists are typically considered to be the most representative of the Boston Brahmins. They are considered White Anglo-Saxon Protestants (WASPs).

Etymology
The phrase "Brahmin Caste of New England" was first coined by Oliver Wendell Holmes Sr., a physician and writer, in an 1860 article in The Atlantic Monthly. The term Brahmin refers to the priestly caste within the four castes in the Hindu caste system. By extension, it was applied in the United States to the old wealthy New England families of British Protestant origin that became influential in the development of American institutions and culture. The influence of the old American gentry has been reduced in modern times, but some vestiges remain, primarily in the institutions and the ideals that they championed in their heyday.

Characteristics

The nature of the Brahmins is referenced in the doggerel "Boston Toast" by Holy Cross alumnus John Collins Bossidy:

While some 19th-century Brahmin families of large fortune were of common origin, still fewer were of an aristocratic origin. The new families were often the first to seek, in typically British fashion, suitable marriage alliances with those old aristocratic New England families that were descended from landowners in England to elevate and cement their social standing. The Winthrops, Dudleys, Saltonstalls, Winslows, and Lymans (descended from English magistrates, gentry, and aristocracy) were, by and large, happy with this arrangement. All of Boston's "Brahmin elite", therefore, maintained the received culture of the old English gentry, including cultivating the personal excellence that they imagined maintained the distinction between gentlemen and freemen, and between ladies and women. They saw it as their duty to maintain what they defined as high standards of excellence, duty, and restraint. Cultivated, urbane, and dignified, a Boston Brahmin was supposed to be the very essence of enlightened aristocracy. The ideal Brahmin was not only wealthy, but displayed what was considered suitable personal virtues and character traits.

The Brahmin was expected to maintain the customary English reserve in his dress, manner, and deportment, cultivate the arts, support charities such as hospitals and colleges, and assume the role of community leader. Although the ideal called on him to transcend commonplace business values, in practice many found the thrill of economic success quite attractive. The Brahmins warned each other against avarice and insisted upon personal responsibility. Scandal and divorce were unacceptable. This culture was buttressed by the strong extended family ties present in Boston society. Young men attended the same prep schools, colleges, and private clubs, and heirs married heiresses. Family not only served as an economic asset, but also as a means of moral restraint. 

Most belonged to the Unitarian or Episcopal churches, although some were Congregationalists or Methodists. Politically they were successively Federalists, Whigs, and Republicans. They were marked by their manners and once distinctive elocution. Their distinctive Anglo-American manner of dress has been much imitated and is the foundation of the style now informally known as preppy. Many of the Brahmin families trace their ancestry back to the original 17th- and 18th-century colonial ruling class consisting of Massachusetts governors and magistrates, Harvard presidents, distinguished clergy, and fellows of the Royal Society of London (a leading scientific body), while others entered New England aristocratic society during the 19th century with their profits from commerce and trade, often marrying into established Brahmin families.

List of families

Adams
Adams Family 
 Samuel Adams (1722–1803), Founding Father; second cousin of:
 John Adams (1735–1826), Founding Father and second President of the United States; husband of Abigail Smith Adams (1744–1818)
 John Quincy Adams (1767–1848), sixth President of the United States
 Charles Francis Adams, Sr. (1807–1886), Ambassador, U.S. congressman
 Charles Francis Adams, Jr. (1835–1915), Civil War general
 John Quincy Adams II (1833–1894), lawyer, politician
 Charles Francis Adams III (1866–1954), U.S. Secretary of the Navy
 Charles Francis Adams IV (1910–1999), industrialist, first president of Raytheon
 Timothy Adams, son of Charles Francis Adams IV
 Henry Brooks Adams (1838–1918), author
 Brooks Adams (1848–1927), historian
 Ivers Whitney Adams (1838–1914), founder of the oldest continuously playing professional baseball team, the Boston Red Stockings

Amory

Amory Family
 John Amory Lowell (1798–1881), merchant.
 Thomas Coffin Amory (1812–1889), lawyer, author.
 Thomas Jonathan Coffin Amory (1828–1864), Civil War general.
 Ernest Amory Codman (1869–1940), surgeon.
 Cleveland Amory (1917–1998), author.

Appleton
Appleton Family

Patrilineal line:
 Daniel Appleton (1785–1849), publisher.
 Frances Appleton (died 1861), wife of Henry Wadsworth Longfellow.
 George Swett Appleton (1821–1878), publisher.
 Jane Means Appleton Pierce (1806–1863), wife of U.S. President Franklin Pierce, was First Lady of the United States from 1853 to 1857.
 Jesse Appleton (1772–1819), second president of Bowdoin College
 John Appleton (1816–1864), assistant Secretary of State, diplomat, U.S. congressman.
 John Appleton, Chief Justice of the Maine Supreme Judicial Court.
 John F. Appleton (1838–1870), lawyer and Union colonel in the American Civil War.
 John James Appleton (1789–1864), ambassador.
 Nathan Appleton (1771–1861), U.S. congressman and merchant.
 Nathaniel Appleton (1693–1784), Congregational minister.
 Samuel Appleton (1625–1696), military and government leader in the Massachusetts Bay Colony and Province of Massachusetts Bay.
 Samuel Appleton (1766–1853), merchant and philanthropist.
 Thomas Gold Appleton (1812–1884), writer and art patron.
 William Appleton (1786–1862), U.S. congressman.
 William Henry Appleton (1814–1899), publisher.
 William Sumner Appleton (1874–1947), philanthropist.

Other notable relatives:
 Thomas Storrow Brown (1803–1888), journalist, writer, orator, and revolutionary in Lower Canada (present-day Quebec)
 Edward Augustus Holyoke (1728–1829), educator and physician
 Alice Mary Longfellow (1850–1928), philanthropist and preservationist
 Ernest Wadsworth Longfellow (1845–1921), artist
 Alpheus Spring Packard (1839–1905), entomologist and paleontologist
 William Alfred Packard (1830–1909), classical scholar
 Charles Storrow Williams (1827–1890), railroad executive
 Edward H. Williams (1824–1899), physician and railroad executive

Bacon
Bacon Family

 Robert Bacon (1860–1919), U.S. Secretary of State; father of
 Robert L. Bacon (1884–1938), member of the U.S. House of Representatives from New York
 Gaspar G. Bacon (1886–1947), politician; father of
 Gaspar G. Bacon, Jr. (1914–1943), actor

Bates 
Bates family

Originally from Boston and Britain:
 Benjamin Bates I (–1710), merchant banker, family patriarch
 Benjamin Bates II (1716 – ), member of the Hell Fire Club
 Frederick Bates (1777–1825), politician
 James Woodson Bates (1788–1846), judge
 Joshua Bates (financier), Barings Bank partner, managed many Brahmin family fortunes, advised Adams family on Court protocol
 Edward Bates (1793–1869), U.S. Attorney General
 Benjamin Bates IV (1808–1878), philanthropist, namesake and benefactor of Bates College

Boylston
Boylston Family

 Thomas Boylston (1644–1695), doctor, family patriarch
 Zabdiel Boylston (1679–1766), physician
 Ward Nicholas Boylston (1747–1828), benefactor, Harvard University

Bradlee
Bradlee Family

Direct line:

 Nathan Bradley I, earliest known member born in America, in Dorchester, Boston, Massachusetts, in 1631
 Samuel Bradlee, constable of Dorchester, Massachusetts
 Nathaniel Bradlee, Boston Tea Party participant, member of Massachusetts Charitable Mechanic Association 
 Josiah Bradlee I, Boston Tea Party participant; m. Hannah Putnam
 Josiah Bradlee III (Harvard), m. Alice Crowninsheld
 Frederick Josiah Bradlee I (Harvard), Director of the Boston Bank
 Frederick Josiah Bradlee, Jr. (Harvard, 1915), on the first All-American football team at Harvard; m. Josephine de Gersdorff
 Frederick Josiah Bradlee III, Broadway actor, author
 Benjamin Crowninshield Bradlee (1921–2014) (Harvard, 1942), Chief Executive Editor of The Washington Post
 Ben Bradlee Jr. (born 1948),  journalist and writer
 Joseph Putnam Bradlee (1783–1838), Commander of the New England Guards, chairman of the State Central Committee, Director and then President of the Boston City Council
 Samuel Bradlee, Jr., lieutenant colonel during the American Revolutionary War
 Thomas Bradlee, Boston Tea Party participant; member of Massachusetts Charitable Mechanics Association; Member of the St. Andrews Lodge of Freemasons
 David Bradlee, Boston Tea Party participant; Captain in the Continental Army, member of the St. Andrews Lodge of Freemasons
 Sarah Bradlee, "Mother of the Boston Tea Party"

Brinley 
Brinley Family of Boston, Newport, and Shelter Island, NY

 Francis Brinley, Esq. (1632–1719), arrived from England in 1651 after the English Civil War, with his two sisters, children of Thomas Brinley, auditor to King Charles I&II, his original home became Newport's White Horse Tavern, Judge, book collector, landowner (RI, MA, NJ), Governor's assistant, m: Hannah Carr (niece of RI Gov. Caleb Carr). Boston estate at Hanover and Elm, current site of Government Center.
 William Brinley, Esq. (1656–1704), first son of Francis, Judge in Newport, co-founder of Trinity Church, Newport, first Anglican church in RI, disinherited by father after marriage
 William Brinley, Esq. (1677–1753), only child of Wm. Brinley, Judge in Monmouth, NJ, passed over for younger cousin Francis Brinley
 John Brinley (1713–1775), Brinley grist mill owner in Oakhurst, NJ
 William Brinley (1754–1840), Major in Revolutionary War
 Sylvester C. Brinley (1816–1905), founded Brinley, Ohio (a.k.a. Brinley Station) in 1855.
 Thomas Brinley (1661–1693), second son of Francis, Boston/London merchant, co-founder of King's Chapel, Boston, first Anglican church in colonial New England.
 Eliakim Hutchinson (1711–1775), Judge, Chief Justice of the Court of Common Pleas for Suffolk County, and one of Boston's richest men, owner of Shirley Place (now Shirley-Eustis House) m:Elizabeth Shirley (daughter of MA Gov William Shirley)
 Colonel Francis Brinley (1690–1765): Colonel in Ancient & Honorable Artillery Company, merchant, landowner (Datchet House/Brinley Place-Roxbury, Brinley Place-Framingham), one of the richest Bostonians of the 18th century, grandfather's heir, m: Deborah Lyde, granddaughter of Judge Nathaniel Byfield
 Francis Brinley Fogg Sr. Esq. (1795–1880), m. Mary Middleton Rutledge of Middleton Place, TN state senator, started Nashville public schools, school board president, namesake Fogg School opened in 1875, a founder of Sewanee University of the South. and Christ Church Cathedral Nashville
 Catherine Grace Frances Moody Nevinson Gore (1798–1861), English writer
 Francis William Brinley (1796–1859), merchant, mayor of Perth Amboy, NJ, Surveyor of NJ state.
 Francis Brinley Jr., Esq. (1800–1880), Harvard 1818-Porcellian Club, President of Boston Common Council, MA state legislator (House and Senate), clerk to Secretary of State, Daniel Webster, delegate to state constitutional convention, commander of the Ancient and Honorable Artillery Company.
 Edward Brinley (1809–1868), Importer for Edward Brinley & Co., Old Faneuil Hall, Boston
 George Brinley (1817–1875), noted book collector, pioneer of the Americanist movement
 Emily Malbone Morgan (1862–1939), founder of the Colonel Daniel Putnam Association and the Society of the Companions of the Holy Cross
 Godfrey Malbone Brinley (1864–1939), top 10 US tennis pro, later master at St. Paul's school
 Edward Brinley Faneuil Adams (1871–1922), Harvard 1892/Law 1897, Harvard Law librarian
 Daniel Putnam Brinley (1873–1963), artist (painter, muralist, impressionist)
 Charles Henry Brinley Esq (1825–1907), Judge in AZ, involved in early CA/AZ politics, int'l merchant, appointed Vice Consul to Mexico by Pres Theo. Roosevelt
 Charles Brinley (1880–1946), silent actor
 Emily Borie Ryerson (1863–1939), Titanic survivor, suffragette, philanthropist 
 Anne Brinley Coddington (1628–1708), third wife of Governor William Coddington, who arrived with the Winthrop fleet in 1630 and became an early MA magistrate, the first Governor of Rhode Island/founder of Portsmouth and Newport, RI, and mother and grandmother of subsequent Governors.
 William Coddington Jr.(1651–1689), colonial Governor of Rhode Island
 Mary Coddington (1654–1693), wife of Gov. Peleg Sanford of RI
 William Coddington III (1680–1755), colonial Governor of Rhode Island, merchant, judge, m: Content Arnold
 Margaret Sanford Hutchinson (1716–1754), wife of Thomas Hutchinson (governor), last loyalist Gov. of MA
 Lucretia Rudolph Garfield (1832–1918), First Lady, wife of 20th U.S. President James A. Garfield
 Ted Danson (born 1947), actor, activist
 Grisell Brinley Sylvester (1635–1687), wife of Nathaniel Sylvester, together they became the first white settlers and owners of all of Shelter Island, NY. She is credited with bringing boxwoods to the colonies.
 Brinley Sylvester (1690–1752), built Sylvester Manor on Shelter Island, which was made a non-profit educational farm by the 11th generation heir.
 Charles Ward Apthorp Jr. (1729–1797), owner of Manhattan's Apthorp Farm, merchant, NY Governor's Council 1763-83
 Sarah Wentworth Apthorp Morton (1759–1846), poet, wife of Perez Morton, MA Speaker and AG.
 Charles Bulfinch (1763–1844), Harvard 1781/4, architect in Boston and of the US Capitol building
 Sen. James Lloyd (1769–1831), Harvard 1787/90, US Senator from MA, merchant, businessman
 Franklin Delano Roosevelt (1882–1945), Harvard 1904, 32nd and longest serving President of the United States
 Benjamin Crowinshield Bradlee (1921–2014), Harvard 1942, Executive Editor of The Washington Post

Buckingham
Buckingham Family

Originally from Boston and Britain:
 William Alfred Buckingham (1804–1875), Governor of Connecticut, U.S. senator.
 Edgar Buckingham, Harvard scholar creator of the Buckingham π theorem, a key theorem in dimensional analysis.

Cabot

Chaffee/Chafee
Chaffee Family

Originally of Hingham, Massachusetts:
 Thomas Chaffee (1610–1683), businessman and landowner
 Jonathon Chaffee (1678–1766), businessman and landowner
 Matthew Chaffee (1657–1723), Boston landowner
 Adna Romanza Chaffee (1842–1914), U.S. general 
 Adna R. Chaffee, Jr. (1884–1941), U.S. general 
 Zechariah Chafee (1885–1957), philosopher, civil libertarian
 John Chafee (1922–1999), U.S. senator 
 Lincoln Chafee (born 1953), former U.S. senator, former Rhode Island governor, 2016 U.S. presidential candidate for the Democratic party

Choate

Choate Family
 Rufus Choate (1799–1859), U.S. senator
 George C. S. Choate (1827–1896), founder of Choate Sanitarium, Pleasantville, New York
 Joseph Hodges Choate (1832–1917), lawyer, diplomat 
 William Gardner Choate (1830–1920), U.S. federal judge, founder of Choate Rosemary Hall
 Sarah Choate Sears (1858–1935), art patron
 Robert B. Choate, Jr. (1924–2009), businessman
 Elizabeth Choate Spykman (1896–1965), writer
 Nathaniel Choate (1899–1965), artist, sculptor

Coffin
Coffin Family

Originally of Newbury and Nantucket:
 Tristram Coffin (1604–1681), colonist, original owner of Nantucket
 William Coffin (1699–1775), merchant, co-founder of Trinity Church
 Sir Isaac Coffin (1759–1839), naval officer
 Charles E. Coffin (1841–1912), industrialist, U.S. congressman
 Charles A. Coffin (1844–1926), industrialist, co-founder of General Electric
 Henry Coffin Nevins (1843–1892), industrialist
 John Coffin Jones, Sr. (1750–1820), Speaker of the Massachusetts House of Representatives
 John Coffin Jones, Jr. (1796–1861), U.S. Minister to Hawaii
 Thomas Coffin Amory (1812–1889), lawyer, author
 Thomas Jonathan Coffin Amory (1828–1864), Civil War general
 David Coffin (active 1980–present), folk musician

Coolidge

 John Calvin Coolidge Sr. (1845–1926), politician and businessman
 Calvin Coolidge (1872–1933), 30th President of the United States
 John Coolidge (1906–2000), businessman and railroad executive
 T. Jefferson Coolidge (1831–1920), Financier, industrialist, and civic leader
 Archibald Cary Coolidge (1866–1928), educator
 John Gardner Coolidge (1863–1936), U.S. ambassador
 Charles A. Coolidge (1844–1926), U.S. Army general

Cooper

 John Cooper (1609–1669), colonist
 Samuel Cooper (1725–1783), clergyman
 Samuel D. Cooper, Jr. (1750–1824), revolutionary
 Samuel D. Cooper III (1778–1853), trade merchant
 Priscilla Cooper Tyler (1816–1889), First Lady of the United States
 Theodore Cooper (1839–1919), civil engineer
 Frederic Taber Cooper (1864–1937), writer

Crowninshield

Crowninshield Family
 Johann Casper Richter von Kronenscheldt, colonist
 Jacob Crowninshield (1770–1808), U.S. congressman
 Arent S. Crowninshield (1843–1908), U.S. Navy admiral
 Caspar Crowninshield (1837–1897), Union Army colonel
 Benjamin William Crowninshield (1837–1892), Union Army colonel
 Frederic Crowninshield (1845–1918), first president of the National Society of Mural Painters
 Benjamin Williams Crowninshield (1772–1851), 5th U.S. Secretary of Navy
 Frank Crowninshield (1872–1947), creator and editor of Vanity Fair
 Bowdin Bradlee Crowninshield (1867–1948), American naval architect

Descendants by marriage:
 William Crowninshield Endicott (1826–1900), 5th U.S. Secretary of War
 Frederick Josiah Bradlee, Jr. (1892–1970), on the first All-American football team (from Harvard)
 Benjamin Crowninshield Bradlee Sr. (1921–2014), Editor-in-chief of The Washington Post
 Benjamin Crowninshield Bradlee Jr. (born 1948), Editor for The Boston Globe
 Josiah Quinn Crowninshield Bradlee (born 1982), founder and CEO of FriendsOfQuinn.com

Cushing
Cushing Family

Originally of Hingham, Massachusetts:
 Caleb Cushing (1800–1879), U.S. congressman and Attorney General
 John Perkins Cushing (1787–1862), China trade merchant, investor
 Thomas Cushing (1725–1788), statesman, revolutionary
 William Cushing (1732–1810), U.S. Supreme Court justice
 Harvey Cushing (1869–1939), neurosurgeon

Descendant by marriage:
 Albert Cushing Read (1887–1967), naval officer

Dana

Dana Family
 Richard Dana (1699–1772), colonial Boston politician.
 Francis Dana (1743–1811), revolutionary.
 Richard Henry Dana, Sr. (1787–1879), lawyer, author.
 Richard Henry Dana, Jr. (1815–1882), lawyer, author (Two Years Before the Mast).

Delano

Delano Family
 Columbus Delano (1809–1896), U.S. Secretary of the Interior
 Jane Delano (1862–1919), founder of the American Red Cross Nursing Service
 Paul Delano (1745–1842), naval officer
 Franklin Delano Roosevelt (1882–1945), President of the United States
 Frederic A. Delano (1863–1953), civic reformer and railroad president

Dudley

Dudley Family
 Gov. Thomas Dudley (1576–1653), Governor of Massachusetts, a founder of Harvard College.
 Mercy Dudley; m. John Woodbridge (1613-1695)
 Martha Woodbridge; m. Samuel Ruggles (1659-1716)
 Rev. Timothy Ruggles (1695-1768); m. Mary White 
 Timothy Ruggles
 Nathaniel Ruggles (1725 - ); m. Deliverance Barrow 
 Anne Dudley Bradstreet (1612–1672), first American poet, wife of Royal Governor Simon Bradstreet.
 Joseph Dudley (1647–1720), Royal Governor of Massachusetts, President of the Dominion of New England, Chief Justice of New York, Member of Parliament, Lt. Governor of the Isle of Wight.
 Paul Dudley (1675–1751), Chief Justice of Massachusetts, member of the Royal Society, founder of the Dudleian lectures at Harvard.
 Paul Dudley Sargent (1745–1828), Army colonel and Revolutionary War hero.
 Dudley Saltonstall (1738–1796), Naval commodore during the Revolution and successful privateer.

Dwight

Dwight Family
 Timothy Dwight IV (1752–1817), president of Yale University.
 Joseph Dwight (1703–1765), lawyer, French and Indian War veteran .
 James Dwight Dana (1813–1895), geologist.

Eliot

Eliot Family
 Samuel Eliot (banker) (1739–1820). 
 Samuel Atkins Eliot (politician) (1798–1862) .
 Charles William Eliot (1834–1926), president of Harvard University.
 Charles Eliot (1859–1897), landscape architect.
 Samuel A. Eliot II (1862–1950), president of the American Unitarian Association.
 Samuel Eliot Morison (1887–1976), maritime author.
 Theodore Lyman Eliot (1928–2019), diplomat.
 Charles Eliot Norton (1827–1908), author.
 T. S. Eliot (1888–1965), Nobel Prize-winning poet, playwright, and literary critic.

Emerson

Emerson Family
 Rev. William Emerson (1769–1811), clergyman; m. Ruth Haskins Emerson.
 Ralph Waldo Emerson (1803–1882), poet; m. Lydia Jackson Emerson.
 Edward Waldo Emerson, (1844–1930).
 Raymond Emerson, (1886–1977).

Endicott
Endicott Family

Salem:
 William Crowninshield Endicott (1826–1900), U.S. Secretary of War.

Dedham:
 Augustus Bradford Endicott (1818–1910), politician.
 Philip Endicott Young (1885–1955), industrialist.
 Henry Bradford Endicott (1853–1920), industrialist.
 Henry Wendell Endicott (1880–1954), philanthropist.

Everett
Everett Family

 Richard Everett (1597–1682), early colonist and native of Holbrook, England. He was a founder of Springfield, Massachusetts, and progenitor of the American Everett family.
 Deac. John Everett (1676–1751), early deacon at the First Church and Parish in Dedham and member of the Massachusetts General Court.
 John Everett (1736–1799), numerous times elected as selectman for Norfolk County, Massachusetts (1770s–1790s) and member of the Massachusetts General Court (1780s–1790s).
 David Everett (1745–1775), revolutionary and killed defending Bunker Hill.
 Moses Everett (1750–1813), judge for Norfolk County, Massachusetts and member of the Massachusetts General Court.
 Rev. Oliver Everett (1752–1802), prominent Congregational minister and judge for Norfolk County, Massachusetts.
 Melatiah Everett (1777–1858), member of the Massachusetts Senate (1812, 1841).
 Horace Everett (1779–1851), member of the Vermont House of Representatives (1819–1820, 1822, 1824, 1834) and the United States House of Representatives from Vermont's 3rd congressional district (1829–1843).
 Ebenezer Everett (1788–1869), long-time Maine state official, trustee of Bowdoin College, member of the Maine Legislature (1840s).
 Alexander Hill Everett (1790–1847), American Ambassador to the Netherlands (1819–1824), Ambassador to Spain (1825), and Ambassador to the Qing Empire (1845–1847) .
 Edward Everett (1794–1865), statesman and diplomat. He was a member of the United States House of Representatives from Massachusetts's 4th congressional district (1825–1835), Governor of Massachusetts (1836–1840), Ambassador to Great Britain (1841–1845), President of Harvard University (1846–1848), the United States Secretary of State (1852–1853), and a United States Senator for Massachusetts (1853–1854).
 Horace Everett (1819–1890), a native of Windsor, Vermont, he was a prominent early founder of Council Bluffs, Iowa.
 Henry Sidney Everett (1834–1898), long-time diplomat, Secretary of the American Legation at Berlin (1877–1884).
 William Everett (1839–1910), member of the United States House of Representatives from Massachusetts's 7th congressional district (1893–1895).
 Sidney Brooks Everett (1868–1901), member of the Boston City Council (1892–1894), American Consul to the Dutch East Indies (appointed 1897), and secretary and chargé de affairs to the American Legation in Guatemala (1900–1901).

Descendants through the marriage of Sarah Preston Everett (1796–1866) and noted journalist Nathan Hale (1784–1863):

 Prof. Nathan Hale Jr. (1818–1871), journalist and professor at Union College.
 Lucretia Peabody Hale (1820–1900), author and journalist.
 Edward Everett Hale (1822–1909), famed author and Unitarian minister and theologian.
 Charles Hale (1831–1882), member and later Speaker of the Massachusetts House of Representatives (1855–1859), Consul-General to Egypt (1864–1870), and the United States Assistant Secretary of State (1872–1873).
 Susan Hale (1833–1910), artist and author.
 Ellen Day Hale (1855–1940), artist.
 Prof. Edward Everett Hale Jr. (1863–1932), distinguished and long-time professor at Union College.
 Philip Leslie Hale (1865–1931), artist.
 Nancy Hale (1908–1988), author.

Fabens

Of Marblehead and Salem:
 William Fabens (1810–1883), lawyer, member of Assembly, Senate
 William Chandler Fabens (1843–1903), Lynn attorney, namesake of Fabens Building
 Samuel Augustus Fabens (1813–1899), master mariner in the East India and California trade
 Francis Alfred Fabens (1814–1872), mercantile businessman, San Francisco judge, attorney
 Joseph Warren Fabens (1821–1875), U.S. Consul at Cayenne, businessman, Envoy Extraordinary of the Dominican Republic
 George Wilson Fabens (1857–1939), attorney, land commissioner and superintendent of Southern Pacific Railroad, namesake of Fabens, Texas

Forbes

Forbes Family
 John Murray Forbes (1813–1898), industrialist
 Edward W. Forbes (1873–1969), Director of the Fogg Art Museum at Harvard University from 1909 to 1944.
 John Forbes Kerry (born 1943), United States Secretary of State (2013–2017), senator from Massachusetts (1985–2013)
 Elliot Forbes (1917–2006), conductor and musicologist
 Robert Bennet Forbes (1804–1889), sea captain, China merchant, ship owner, writer
 William Howell Forbes (1837–1896), businessman
 Beatrice Forbes Manz, professor of history at Tufts University

Gardner
Gardner Family

Originally of Essex county:
 Samuel Pickering Gardner (1767–1843), merchant.
 John Lowell Gardner (1808–1884), merchant.
 John Lowell Gardner II (1837–1898), merchant.
 Augustus P. Gardner (1865–1918), U.S. congressman.
 Isabella Stewart Gardner (1840-1924), art collector, philanthropist, and patron of the arts.

Gillett

 Jonathan Gillett (1609–1677), colonist
 Edward Bates Gillett (1817–1899), attorney
 Frederick Huntington Gillett (1851–1935), 37th Speaker of the United States House of Representatives
 Arthur Lincoln Gillett (1859–1938), clergyman
 Ezra Hall Gillett (1823-1875), clergyman and author
Charles Ripley Gillett (1855-1948), clergyman

Hallowell 
Hallowell Family

 Ward Nicholas Boylston (1747–1828), merchant and philanthropist
 Norwood Penrose Hallowell (1839–1914), colonel in the 54th Massachusetts regiment
 Norwood Penrose Hallowell Jr. (1875-1961), President of Lee, Higginson & Co. 
 Edward Needles Hallowell (1836–1871), An officer in the 54th Massachusetts. He and his brother were collectively portrayed by actor Cary Elwes in his role as Major Cabot Forbes in the Civil War movie Glory.
 John Hallowell (1878–1927), Harvard Football player and assistant to Herbert Hoover in the United States Food Administration during World War I

Healey/Dall

 Mark Healey (1791–1872), originally of New Hampshire, merchant and first president of the Merchant's Bank
 Caroline Wells Healey (1822–1912), writer, feminist, and abolitionist
 Charles Henry Appleton Dall (1816–1886), first Unitarian minister to India
 William Healey Dall (1845–1912), malacologist, paleontologist, and explorer of Alaska

Holmes

Holmes Family
 Abiel Holmes (1763–1837), clergyman
 Oliver Wendell Holmes, Sr. (1809–1894), doctor, author
 Oliver Wendell Holmes, Jr. (1841–1935), U.S. Supreme Court justice

Jackson

Jackson Family
 Edward Jackson (1708–1757), colonist; m. Dorothy Quincy Jackson
 Jonathan Jackson (1743–1810), merchant, revolutionary; m. Hannah Tracy Jackson
 Charles Jackson (1775–1855), Massachusetts Supreme Court justice
 James Jackson (1777–1867), Physician m. Elizabeth Cabot
 Francis Henry Jackson (1815–1873), m. Sarah Ann Boott
 James Tracy Jackson (1843–1900), m. Rebecca Nelson Borland
 James Tracy Jackson, Jr. (1881–1952), m. Rachel Brooks
 Francis Gardner Jackson (1914–1970), m. Jane Matthews
 Francis Gardner Jackson, Jr. (born 1943), m. Pamela Graves Hardee
 Patrick Graves Jackson (born 1969), Surgeon, husband to Ketanji Brown Jackson and related to Oliver Wendell Holmes Jr.
 Amelia Lee Jackson: wife of Oliver Wendell Holmes, Sr.
 Oliver Wendell Holmes Jr., Associate Justice of the Supreme Court of the United States
 Patrick Tracy Jackson (1780–1847), co-founder of the Boston Manufacturing Company
 Hannah Jackson, wife of Francis Cabot Lowell
 Lydia Jackson, wife of Ralph Waldo Emerson
 Greling Jackson

Knowles

Knowles Family
 Freeman Knowles (1846–1910)
 Horace G. Knowles (1863–1937)
 John Knowles (1926–2001)
 Malcolm Knowles (1913–1997)
 Tony Knowles (politician) (born 1943)
 Warren P. Knowles (1908–1993)
 William Standish Knowles (1917–2012)

Lawrence

Lawrence Family
 Samuel Lawrence (died 1827), revolutionary
 Amos Lawrence (1786–1852), merchant
 Amos Adams Lawrence (1814–1886), abolitionist
 William Lawrence (1850–1941), Episcopal bishop
 William Appleton Lawrence (1889–1963), Episcopal bishop
 Frederic C. Lawrence (1899–1989), Episcopal bishop
 Abbott Lawrence (1792–1855), U.S. congressman, founder of Lawrence, Massachusetts
 Luther Lawrence (died 1839), politician
Descendant by marriage: Abbott Lawrence Lowell (1856–1943), president of Harvard University

Lodge

Lodge Family
 John Ellerton Lodge, husband of Anna Cabot
 Henry Cabot Lodge (1850–1924), U.S. senator
 George Cabot Lodge (1873–1909), poet
 Henry Cabot Lodge Jr. (1902–1985), U.S. senator, U.S. Ambassador to the United Nations
 George Cabot Lodge II (born 1927), Harvard Business School professor, 1962 U.S. Senate candidate from Massachusetts against Edward M. Kennedy
 Henry Sears Lodge (1930–2017)
 John Davis Lodge (1903–1985), 79th governor of Connecticut, U.S. ambassador
 Lily Lodge (1930-2021)

Lowell

 John Lowell (1743–1802), Member of the Continental Congress and Federal Judge
 John Lowell (1769–1840), lawyer and Federalist
 John Amory Lowell (1798–1881), industrialist, philanthropist
 John Lowell (1824–1897), Federal Judge
 John Lowell (1856–1922), lawyer
 Mary Emlen Lowell (1884–1975), Countess of Berkeley, m. Randall Thomas Mowbray Berkeley, 8th Earl of Berkeley
 Ralph Lowell (1890–1978), philanthropist, founder of WGBH
 Olivia Lowell (1898–1977), m. Augustus Thorndike (1896–1986)
 James Lowell (1869–1933), Federal Judge
 Augustus Lowell (1830–1900), industrialist, philanthropist
 Percival Lowell (1855–1916), famous astronomer
 Abbott Lawrence Lowell (1856–1943), President of Harvard University, 1909–1933
 Elizabeth Lowell (1862–1935), m. William Lowell Putnam (see below)
 Katherine Putnam (1890–1983), m. Harvey Bundy (1888–1963)
 William Bundy (1917–2000), foreign affairs advisor to John F. Kennedy and Lyndon Johnson
 McGeorge Bundy (1919–1996), U.S. National Security Advisor
 Katharine Lawrence Bundy (1923–2014), m. Hugh Auchincloss Jr. (1915–1998), 1st cousin once removed of Hugh D. Auchincloss
 Hugh Auchincloss III (born 1949), m. Laurie Hollis Glimcher (born 1951), divorced; daughter of Melvin J. Glimcher
 Jake Auchincloss (born 1988), Captain in United States Marines, City of Newton, Massachusetts Councilman (2015–2020), United States Congressman for Massachusetts (2021-present)
 Roger Putnam (1893–1972), Mayor of Springfield, Director of the Economic Stability Administration (ESA)
 Amy Lowell (1874–1925), Pulitzer Prize-winning poet
 Francis Cabot Lowell (1775–1817), founder of the Industrial Revolution in the United States
 John Lowell, Jr. (1799–1836), Founder of the Lowell Institute
 Francis Cabot Lowell, Jr. (1803–1874), industrialist
 George Gardner Lowell (1830–1885)
 Francis Cabot Lowell (1855–1911), Federal Judge
 Edward Jackson Lowell (1845–1894), historian
 Guy Lowell (1870–1927), architect
 Rebecca Russell Lowell (1779–1853), m. Samuel Pickering Gardner (1767–1843)
 John Lowell Gardner (1804–1884)
 John Lowell Gardner (1837–1898), m. Isabella Stewart (1840–1924)
 Charles Lowell (1782–1861), Unitarian minister
 Charles Russell Lowell (1807–1870)
 Charles Russell Lowell, Jr. (1835–1864), Civil War general, m. Josephine Shaw
 Harriet Lowell (1836–1920), m. George Putnam (1834–1917)
 William Lowell Putnam (1861–1923), lawyer and banker, m. Elizabeth Lowell (see above)
 Mary Traill Spence Lowell Putnam (1810–1898), author, translator
 Robert Traill Spence Lowell (1816–1891)
 Robert T.S. Lowell (1860–1887)
 Robert T.S. Lowell (1887–1950), naval officer
 Robert Lowell (1917–1977), Pulitzer Prize–winning poet
 James Russell Lowell (1819–1891), American Romantic poet, Ambassador to Spain and England

Lyman

 Theodore Lyman (1753–1839), China trade merchant, commissioned Samuel McIntire to build one of New England's finest country houses, The Vale 
 Theodore Lyman II (1792–1849), brigadier general of militia, Massachusetts state representative, mayor of Boston
 Theodore Lyman III (1833–1897), natural scientist, aide-de-camp to Major General Meade during the American Civil War, and United States congressman from Massachusetts
 Theodore Lyman IV (1874–1954), director of Jefferson Physics Lab, Harvard. The Lyman series of spectral lines, the crater Lyman on the far side of the Moon, and the Lyman Physics Building at Harvard are named after him.

Minot

Minot Family
 Charles Sedgwick Minot (1852–1914), anatomist
 George Richards Minot (1885–1950), winner of the Nobel Prize in Medicine
 Henry Davis Minot (1859–1890), ornithologist
 Susan Minot (born 1956), author
 Alexandria Minot (born 1981), lawyer, human rights activist

Norcross
Norcross family

Original from Watertown, Massachusetts
 Otis Norcross (1811–1882), mayor of Boston
 Amasa Norcross (1824–1898), politician
 Eleanor Norcross (1854–1923), artist

Oakes

Oakes family
 Urian Oakes (1631–1681), minister and educator; president of Harvard College.

Otis

Otis family
 James Otis, Jr. (1725–1783), revolutionary
 Mercy Otis Warren (1728–1814), playwright, revolutionary
 Samuel Allyne Otis (1740–1814), politician
 Harrison Gray Otis (1765–1848), U.S. senator, mayor of Boston

Paine
Paine Family
 Robert Treat Paine (1731–1814), lawyer, politician, and a Founding Father of the United States who signed the Continental Association and the Declaration of Independence. 
 Robert Treat Paine Jr. (1773–1811), a poet and editor
 Charles Jackson Paine (1833–1916), railroad executive, yachtsman, and general in the Union Army during the American Civil War.
 Robert Treat Paine (philanthropist) (1835–1910), lawyer, philanthropist, and social reformer 
 Sumner Paine (1868–1904), American shooter who competed at the 1896 Summer Olympics. 
 John Paine (sport shooter) (1870–1951), American shooter who competed at the 1896 Summer Olympics.
 Lyman Paine (1901–1978), architect and far-left activist.
 Robert Treat Paine Storer (1893–1962), All-American football player for Harvard University and decorated veteran of World War I. 
 Robert T. Paine (zoologist) (1933–2016), the ecologist who coined the term "keystone species". 
 Michael Paine (1928–2018), an acquaintance of Lee Harvey Oswald, unknown Paine and his wife Oswald had been hiding his Carcano Model 38 infantry carbine rifle in the garage of their Irving, Texas home, that was used to kill President John F. Kennedy, and wound Texas Governor John Connally in November 1963, and used beforehand in a failed attempt on the life of far-right activist, resigned Army General, Edwin Walker, in April of that year.  
 Ruth Paine (1932–present) friend of Marina Oswald, who was living with her at the time of the assassination of President Kennedy.

Palfrey
Palfrey Family

 Peter Palfrey (1611–1663), one of the founders of Salem, Salem representative to the first General Court of Massachusetts Bay Colony
 William Palfrey (1741–1780), American patriot, Aide-de-camp to George Washington, chief clerk to John Hancock, successful merchant
 John G. Palfrey I (1796–1881), played a leading role in the creation of Harvard Divinity School, first Dean of Harvard Divinity School, U.S. Congressman from Massachusetts, Unitarian minister, historian
 Francis Winthrop Palfrey (1831–1889), historian, decorated Union officer
 Sarah Palfrey Danzig (1912–1996), won 18 national tennis championship titles (singles, doubles, mixed doubles)
 John G. Palfrey V (1919–1979), member of President Kennedy's Atomic Energy Commission, Dean of Columbia University 
 John G. "Sean" Palfrey VI (born 1945), pediatrician and advocate, Harvard Faculty Dean of Adams House with Judy Palfrey
 John G. Palfrey VII (born 1972), educator and author, historian, Headmaster of Phillips Academy

Parkman

Parkman Family
 Samuel Parkman (1751–1824), investor; father of
 George Parkman, physician, investor, philanthropist; victim in the Parkman–Webster murder case
 Francis Parkman, Jr., historian; grandson of Samuel Parkman; nephew of George Parkman

Peabody

Peabody Family
 Elizabeth Palmer Peabody (1804–1894), American educator who opened the first English-language kindergarten in the United States
 Endicott Peabody (1857–1944), Episcopal priest, founder of the Groton School for Boys
 Endicott "Chubb" Peabody (1920–1997), governor of Massachusetts
 George Peabody (1795–1869), entrepreneur, philanthropist who founded the House of Morgan and the Peabody Institute
 Joseph Peabody (1757–1844), merchant, shipowner, philanthropist whose company sailed clipper ships in the Old China Trade from its base in Salem, Massachusetts
 Mary Tyler Peabody Mann (1806–1887), American author
 Nathaniel Peabody (1774–1855)
 Richard R. Peabody (1892–1936), author of The Common Sense of Drinking, a major influence on Alcoholics Anonymous founder Bill Wilson
 Sophia Amelia Peabody Hawthorne (1809–1871), painter, illustrator, wife of American author Nathaniel Hawthorne

Perkins

Perkins Family
 Thomas Handasyd Perkins (1764–1854), merchant, pioneer of the China trade, philanthropist
 Charles Perkins (1823–1886), art historian, philanthropist, founder of the Museum of Fine Arts
 Edward Perkins (1856–1905), constitutional lawyer
 Maxwell Perkins (1884–1947), literary editor of Ernest Hemingway, William Faulkner, and F. Scott Fitzgerald

Phillips

Phillips Family
 Rev. George Phillips (1593–1644), gateway ancestor to the Phillips New England family, one of the founders of Watertown, Massachusetts
 Christopher H. Phillips (1920–2008), politician, diplomat
 Samuel Phillips, Jr. (1752–1802), politician, founder of Phillips Academy
 John Phillips (1719–1795), educator, founder of Phillips Exeter Academy
 John Sanborn Phillips (1861–1949), publisher of McClure's Magazine
 Wendell Phillips (1811–1884), abolitionist
 William Phillips (1878–1968), diplomat
 Samuel Phillips (1690–1771), first pastor of the South Church of Andover

Other notable relatives:
 Phillips Brooks (1835–1893), American Episcopal clergyman and author
 Samuel Phillips Huntington (1927–2008), Harvard University political science professor and author; grandson of John Sanborn Phillips
 Charles F. Brush (1849–1929), inventor, philanthropist
 Bill Gates (born 1955), billionaire software pioneer, philanthropist, investor, entrepreneur

Putnam

Putnam Family
 James Putnam (1725–1789), last attorney general in Massachusetts before American Revolution; judge and politician in New Brunswick
 James Putnam (1756–1838), Canadian politician
 Major General Israel Putnam (1718–1790), U.S. general during the Revolutionary War
 Colonel Daniel Putnam (1759–1831), colonel in U.S. Continental Army; his home is Putnam Elms
 John Day Putnam (1837–1904), Wisconsin politician
 William Lowell Putnam (1861–1924), and Elizabeth Lowell Putnam
 George P. Putnam (1887–1950), publisher, explorer, husband of Amelia Earhart
 Katherine L. Putnam (1890–1983), wife of Harvey Hollister Bundy
 Roger Lowell Putnam (1893–1972), politician, businessman

Quincy

Quincy Family
 Edmund Quincy (1602–1636), settled in Massachusetts Bay Colony in 1633
 Josiah Quincy II (1744–1775), lawyer, revolutionary
 Josiah Quincy III (1772–1864), member of the U.S. House of Representatives from Massachusetts, mayor of Boston, president of Harvard University
 Dorothy Quincy Hancock, wife of John Hancock
 Abigail Smith Adams (1744–1818), wife of John Adams
 John Quincy Adams (1767–1848), President of the United States

Rice
Rice Family

Originally of Sudbury, Massachusetts:
 Deacon Edmund Rice (1594–1663), colonist
 Alexander Hamilton Rice (1818–1895), industrialist, mayor of Boston, governor of Massachusetts, member of the U.S. House of Representatives from Massachusetts
 Alexander Hamilton Rice, Jr. (1875–1956), physician, geographer, explorer
 Brigadier General Americus Vespucius Rice (1835–1904), U.S. general, member of the U.S. House of Representatives from Ohio, banker
 Brigadier General Edmund Rice (1842–1906), U.S. general, Medal of Honor recipient
 Edmund Rice (1819–1889), U.S. senator, member of the U.S. House of Representatives from Minnesota
 Henry Mower Rice (1816–1894), U.S. senator
 Luther Rice (1783–1836), Baptist clergyman, missionary to India
 Thomas Rice (1768–1854), member of the U.S. House of Representatives from Massachusetts
 William Marsh Rice (1816–1900), businessman, founder of Rice University
 William North Rice (1845–1928), geologist, educator
 William Whitney Rice (1826–1896), member of the U.S. House of Representatives from Massachusetts
 William B. Rice (1840–1909), industrialist, philanthropist

Saltonstall

Saltonstall Family
 Leverett Saltonstall I (1783–1845), politician, educator
 Leverett Saltonstall (1892–1979), U.S. senator
 William L. Saltonstall (1927–2009), politician
 Elizabeth Saltonstall (1900–1990), lithographer, painter
 Philip Saltonstall Weld (1915–1984), World War II commando, environmentalist
 William G. Saltonstall (1905–1989), 8th Principal of Phillips Exeter Academy

Sargent

 Colonel Epes Sargent (1690–1762), colonel of militia before the Revolution and a justice of the general session court for more than 30 years
 Paul Dudley Sargent (1745–1828), Revolutionary officer, one of the founding overseers of Bowdoin College
 Harrison Tweed (1885–1969), lawyer, civic leader
 Tweed Roosevelt (born 1942), great-grandson of President Theodore Roosevelt
 John Sargent (1750–1824), Loyalist officer during the American Revolution
 Winthrop Sargent (1753–1820), patriot, governor, politician, writer; member of the Federalist Party
 Judith Sargent Murray (1751–1820), feminist, essayist, playwright, poet; her home is the Sargent House Museum
 Daniel Sargent Sr. (1730–1806), merchant, owned Sargent's Wharf in Boston
 Daniel Sargent (1764–1842), merchant, politician
 Daniel Sargent Curtis (1825–1908), lawyer, banker, trustee of the BPL, owner of Palazzo Barbaro
 Henry Sargent (1770–1845), painter, military man
 Henry Winthrop Sargent (1810–1882), horticulturist, landscape gardener
 Lucius Manlius Sargent (1786–1867), author, antiquarian, temperance advocate
 Brigadier General Horace Binney Sargent (1821–1908), U.S. Civil War general (Union Army), politician
 John Singer Sargent (1856–1925), artist, considered the "leading portrait painter of his generation"
 Charles Sprague Sargent (1841–1927), botanist, first director of Harvard University's Arnold Arboretum 
 Winthrop Sargent Gilman (1808–1884), head of the banking house of Gilman, Son & Co. in New York City
 Epes Sargent (1813–1880), editor, poet, playwright
 Francis W. Sargent (1915–1998), 64th governor of Massachusetts
 Benjamin Crowninshield Bradlee (1921–2014), (Harvard, 1942): editor of The Washington Post
 Frances Sargent Osgood (1811–1850), poet, one of the most popular women writers during her time
 Anna Maria Wells (née Foster; –1868), early American poet, children's author

Sears

Sears Family
 Richard Sears (1610–1676), colonist
 David Sears II (1787–1871), philanthropist, merchant, landowner
 Clara Endicott Sears (1863–1960), author, philanthropist
 Mason Sears (1899–1973), politician, ambassador
 Emily Sears, wife of Henry Cabot Lodge Jr.
 John W. Sears (1930–2014), politician

Sedgwick

Sedgwick Family
 Major General Robert Sedgwick (1611–1656), immigrant, Commander of the Massachusetts Bay Colony forces
 Hon. Theodore Sedgwick (1746–1813), 4th Speaker of the U.S. House of Representatives; major in U.S. Continental Army
 Major General John Sedgwick (1813–1864), U.S. Civil War general (Union Army)
 Theodore Sedgwick, Jr. (1780–1839), lawyer, author; politician
 Theodore Sedgwick III (1811–1859), attorney, legal author, U.S. Minister to France
 Catharine Maria Sedgwick (1789–1876), one of the first noted female writers in the United States
 Henry Dwight Sedgwick (1785–1831), father of
 Henry Dwight Sedgwick II (1824–1903), father of
 Ellery Sedgwick (1872–1960), magazine editor; father of
 Ellery Sedgwick, Jr. (1908–1991), father of
 Theodore “Tod” Sedgwick, diplomat, publisher
 Henry Dwight Sedgwick III (1861–1957), lawyer, author; father of
 Henry Dwight Sedgwick IV (1896–1914)
 Francis Minturn Sedgwick (1904–1967), father of
 Edith Minturn Sedgwick (1943–1971), American socialite, actress, fashion model who worked with Andy Warhol
 Robert Minturn Sedgwick (1899–1976), father of
 Henry Dwight Sedgwick V (1928–2018), venture capitalist; husband of Helen Stern (1930–2019) and Patricia Rosenwald Sedgwick (born 1933); father of
 Mike Stern (born Michael Sedgwick 1953), jazz guitarist
 Kyra Minturn Sedgwick (born 1965), actress, producer, director; wife of Kevin Bacon; mother of
 Sosie Bacon (born 1992), actress
 Holly Sedgwick (born ), mother of
 Justin Nozuka (born 1988)
 George Nozuka (born 1986)
 Philip Nozuka (born 1987)
 Robert Sedgwick (born )

Shattuck
Lemuel Shattuck (1793-1859), politician, historian, bookseller and publisher.
Henry Lee Shattuck (1879-1971), attorney, philanthropist, and politician

Shaw
 Robert Gould Shaw (1776–1853) m. Elizabeth Willard Parkman (1785–1853)
 Francis George Shaw (1809–1882) m. Sarah Blake Sturgis (1815–1902)
 Robert Gould Shaw (1837–1863)
 Josephine Shaw (1843–1905) m. Charles Russell Lowell (1835–1864)
 Quincy Adams Shaw (1825–1908) m. Pauline Agassiz (1841–1917)
 Robert Gould Shaw II (1872–1930) m. Nancy Langhorne (1879–1964)
 Robert Gould Shaw III (1898–1970)
 Louis Agassiz Shaw II (1906–1987)

Thayer

Thayer Family
 Brevet Brigadier General Sylvanus Thayer (1785–1872), U.S. general (Army), Father of West Point 
 Nathaniel Thayer (1769–1840), Unitarian minister; father of
 Nathaniel Thayer, Jr. (1808–1883), financier, philanthropist; partner in John E. Thayer and brother firm which he left to clerks Kidder and Peabody after his retirement. One of the most generous citizens of Boston donating Thayer Hall to Harvard University; an overseer of Harvard, 1866–1868, and a fellow, 1868–1875; father of
 Nathaniel Thayer, III (1851–1911), capitalist, pioneer railroad promoter
 Bayard Thayer (1862–1916), millionaire sportsman, horticulturist
 Eugene Van Rensselaer Thayer (1855–1907), financier, capitalist; father of
 Eugene Van Rensselaer Thayer, Jr. (1881–1937), Harvard class of 1904; President of Merchants and Chase National Banks; Chairman of Stutz motorcars
 James Bradley Thayer (1831–1902), American legal writer, educationist
 Ernest Thayer (1863–1940), American poet, author of "Casey at the Bat", and uncle of Scofield Thayer
 Scofield Thayer (1889–1982), American poet, publisher
 Eli Thayer (1819–1899), member of the U.S. House of Representatives from Massachusetts
 John A. Thayer (1857–1917), member of the U.S. House of Representatives from Massachusetts
 John R. Thayer (1845–1916), member of the U.S. House of Representatives from Massachusetts
 Brevet Major General John Milton Thayer (1820–1906), U.S. senator, U.S. Civil War general (Union Army); governor of Nebraska
 Webster Thayer (1857–1933), judge at the trial of Sacco and Vanzetti
 William Greenough Thayer (1863–1934), American educator; father of
 Sigourney Thayer (1896–1944), theatrical producer, aviator, poet
 Tommy Thayer (born 1960), lead guitarist for the rock band Kiss

Thorndike

Thorndike Family
 Israel Thorndike (1755–1832), merchant, politician
 Augustus Thorndike (1896–1986), physician
 George Thorndike Angell (1823–1909), lawyer, philanthropist

Tudor

Tudor Family
 William Tudor (1750–1819), lawyer, politician, founder of the Massachusetts Historical Society
 William Tudor (1779–1830), cofounder of the North American Review and the Boston Athenaeum
 Frederic Tudor (1783–1864), Boston's "Ice King", founder of the Tudor Ice Company
 Tasha Tudor (1915–2008), illustrator and author of children's books

Warren

 Richard Warren (1578–1628), London merchant, Mayflower passenger
 James Warren (1726–1808), paymaster general of Continental Army, major general in Massachusetts colony militia, president of Massachusetts Congress
 Mercy Otis Warren (1728–1814), playwright, historian, revolutionary
 Joseph Warren (1741–1775), major general in Massachusetts colony militia, hero/martyr of Bunker Hill, president of Massachusetts Congress; sent Paul Revere on his famous midnight ride
 John Warren (1753–1815), founder of Harvard Medical School, surgeon at Bunker Hill, co-founder of the Massachusetts Medical Society 
 John Collins Warren (1778–1856), surgeon, president of the American Medical Association, founding dean of Harvard Medical School, a founder of Massachusetts General Hospital; gave first public demonstration of surgical anesthesia, a founder of The New England Journal of Medicine
 Winslow Warren (1838–1930), American attorney who served as Collector of Customs for the Port of Boston during the second administration of Grover Cleveland
 John Collins Warren Jr. (1842–1927), surgeon, president of the American Surgical Association
 Charles Warren (1868–1954), lawyer, author, legal scholar who won a Pulitzer Prize for his book The Supreme Court in United States History

Weld

Weld Family
 Thomas Weld (born ), colonist, Puritan minister
 William Gordon Weld (1775–1825), merchant
 William Fletcher Weld (1800–1881), merchant, philanthropist
 Ezra Greenleaf Weld (1801–1874), daguerreotypist
 Theodore Dwight Weld (1803–1895), abolitionist
 Stephen Minot Weld (1806–1867), politician, educator
 George Walker Weld (1840–1905), philanthropist
 Brevet Brigadier General Stephen Minot Weld, Jr. (1842–1920), U.S. Civil War general (Union Army)
 Charles Goddard Weld (1857–1911), philanthropist
 Isabel Weld Perkins (1877–1948), philanthropist
 Philip Saltonstall Weld (1915–1984), World War II commando, environmentalist
 Tuesday Weld (born 1943), actress
 William Weld (born 1945), governor of Massachusetts, 2016 Libertarian Party Vice Presidential Candidate

Whitney

 Eli Whitney (1765–1825)
 William Collins Whitney (1841–1904)

Wigglesworth

Wigglesworth Family
 Michael Wigglesworth (1631–1705), colonist, clergyman; father of
 Edward Michael Wigglesworth (c. 1693–1765), clergyman, educator; father of
 Edward Wigglesworth (1732–1794), academician
 Richard B. Wigglesworth (1891–1960), ambassador to Canada, member of the U.S. House of Representatives from Massachusetts

Winthrop
Winthrop Family

Patrilineal descendants:
 Lucy Winthrop Downing: mother of diplomat Sir George Downing, 1st Baronet, founder of New York, of Downing Street, London, and ultimately of Downing College, Cambridge, UK; Lucy's letter to her brother Governor Winthrop provided the impetus for the founding of Harvard College; sister of
 John Winthrop (1588–1649), founding governor of Massachusetts Bay Colony; father of
 John Winthrop (1606–1676), governor of Connecticut
 Fitz-John Winthrop (1637–1711), governor of Connecticut
 John Winthrop, husband of Anne Dudley, granddaughter of Thomas Dudley
 John Winthrop (1714–1779), acting president of Harvard, pioneer of American science
 James Winthrop (1752–1821), librarian, jurist
 Thomas Lindall Winthrop (1760–1841), lieutenant governor of Massachusetts
 Robert Charles Winthrop (1809–1894), lawyer, politician, philanthropist

Other descendants:

Kwame Anthony Appiah (born 1954), philosopher, author, cultural theorist and descendant in the female line of John Winthrop.

Bibliography

 Cleveland Amory, The Proper Bostonians, 1947

See also
 American gentry
 Bourgeoisie
 Colonial families of Maryland
 First Families of Virginia
 Golden Square Mile
 Old Philadelphians
 Philadelphia Main Line
 Socialite
 Upper class
 White Anglo-Saxon Protestant

References

American upper class
 
English-American culture in Massachusetts
High society (social class)
White American culture in Massachusetts